The Vermin Club was an organisation of grassroots Conservative Party supporters in Britain in the late 1940s.

On the evening of 4 July 1948, Aneurin Bevan, the Labour Government's Minister of Health, addressed the annual Labour rally for the North of England at Belle Vue, Manchester, and described Conservatives as "lower than vermin". Young Tories took on the description with ironic self-deprecation and set up the Vermin Club.

Members took to wearing vermin badges (a chrome badge featuring a rat and the word VERMIN). A whole hierarchy was established, so that those who recruited ten new party members wore badges identifying them as vile vermin; those who recruited twenty five were very vile vermin. Margaret Thatcher was an early member of the group and rose through the ranks to become a "Chief Rat". The club boasted a membership of between 105,000 and 120,000 at its height.

See also
 Basket of deplorables, a similar disparagement that galvanised the political opposition

References

1948 establishments in the United Kingdom
1951 disestablishments in the United Kingdom
Defunct clubs and societies of the United Kingdom
Organisations associated with the Conservative Party (UK)
Organizations disestablished in 1951
Organizations established in 1948